Samuel F. B. Morse High School is an urban public high school located in southeastern San Diego in the neighborhood of Skyline Hills serving grades 9–12 in the American K-12 education system. Morse, which serves a predominantly socioeconomically-disadvantaged student population, has produced several notable athletes among its alumni

History
Encanto Hill Farms

The area where Morse would eventually be built was once farmland owned and cultivated by the Ito family, called Encanto Hill Farms. The family grew acres of avocados, squash, string beans, and bell peppers. They were neighbors with four other Japanese families who also farmed. Development pressure and other factors led to the disappearance of Japanese American farmers south of Interstate 8

Opening

Named after the inventor Samuel Finley Breese Morse, Morse High first opened its doors in 1962 to 1,200 freshmen, sophomores, and juniors. The Skyline neighborhood was only recently established, and it would take years for the vacant lots to be developed. The principal of the school was Thomas E. Walt. In attendance for the school's dedication in 1962 was Leila Morse, the granddaughter of Samuel F.B. Morse.

Image and perceptions in the 1990s

Morse was not immune to the gang-violence that plagued Southeast San Diego throughout the 1980s and 1990s. A highly publicized execution-style double-homicide that occurred on Morse's front lawn in 1992, in addition to the school's campus serving as a geographical locus of several major gangs in the area (for which many of its students were members of or associated with), painted Morse in an entirely negative light.
A staff member noted these points in a 1992 interview, acknowledging the perception of the school, but also naming its reality: 

Academic controversy in the early 2000s

Amid criticism of the school's declining performance after its administrative shake-up in 2002, then-superintendent Carl Cohn brought in Todd Irving, a Co-Principal from East Palo Alto High School, as Co-Principal to assist Principal Rocio Weiss for the 2006–2007 school year.  Following Rocio Weiss's departure as Co-Principal in 2008, Todd Irving retained his role as Principal of Morse High School. The current principal (2018) is Cynthia Larkin.

One of the few remaining in The Southeast

When Gompers High School was converted to a grade 6-12 charter school in 2007, Morse High School and the rebuilt Lincoln High School became the only remaining public senior high schools in Southeast San Diego.

Background
Morse High School for much of the 1990s and 2000s was the most populous high school in the San Diego Unified School District, peaking at 3,142 students in 2001, for a school originally designed to accommodate 1,800. Morse serves the racially and socioeconomically diverse communities of Alta Vista, Bay Terraces, Encanto, Jamacha-Lomita, Paradise Hills, and Skyline in Southeast San Diego.  Morse historically had a substantial Black, Latino, and Filipino student population especially throughout the late-1980's through the mid-2000's. In 2006–2007, with an enrollment at 2,795, demographics from the California Department of Education show that 35% of the students were Filipino, followed by Hispanic-Latino (34%), Black (21%), and non-Hispanic White (4.0%). Nearly 70% of the student body was eligible for free or reduced-price lunch at the time. More current statistical data in 2019-2020 show some demographic shifts from the 2006-2007 data listed prior, where, out of a dramatically smaller 1,718 students, there was a slight increase in Latinos at 36%, followed by Filipinos at 35%, a substantial reduction in Black students at 12%, an increase in Two or more races at 8%, Asian students at 3%, Pacific Islander students at 2%, and a slight decrease in non-Hispanic White students at 2%.
 Students who qualify for free-reduced lunch has hovered around 80% of the school population over the past few years.

Academics
Academic Performance Index place the school in schoolwide API of 640 (growth) in 2007 from 648 (base) in 2006 where 800 is the targeted California state goal.  As of 2006, Morse High School has an API Statewide Rank of 3 out of 10, and an API Similar Schools Rank of 6 out of 10.

Programs

Athletics 
Morse offers a full range of athletic teams. These teams compete under the Morse Tigers team name against other schools in the district and in the surrounding area. Tryouts for the teams usually take place the previous semester.  Morse High School is one of very few high schools to have produced two Olympic Gold Medalists (Arnie Robinson and Monique Henderson).

Notable alumni

 Archie Amerson, football, c/o 1993
 Tommy Bennett, football, c/o 1991
 Quintin Berry, baseball, c/o 2003
 Marcus Brady, football c/o 1997
 Rashard Cook, football c/o 1995
 Terrell Davis, football, attended Morse but later transferred to Lincoln High School.
 David Dunn, football c/o 1990
 Rome dela Rosa, PBA (Philippine Basketball Association) c/o 2009
 Lonnie Ford, football c/o 1997
 Monique Henderson, track and field, Olympic gold medalist, c/o 2001
 Sam Horn, baseball c/o 1982
 Adam Jones, baseball c/o 2003
 Faizon Love, actor and comedian, c/o 1986
 Lincoln Kennedy, football, c/o 1988
 Cliff Levingston, basketball, c/o 1979
 Charles Lewis, c/o 1984, San Diego City Council member
 Pat Loika, podcaster
 Samuel Madden (MIT), professor of computer science at MIT, c/o 1994
 Mark McLemore, baseball c/o 1982
 Rafael Peralta, Sergeant, USMC; Navy Cross recipient; casualty Iraq War c/o 1997
 Arnie Robinson, Olympic medalist in track and field
 Marcus Smith, football c/o 2003

Notable faculty 
 Bob Mendoza, Breitbard Hall of Fame Coaching Legend, coached football, baseball and golf

References

External links 

 School website

Educational institutions established in 1962
High schools in San Diego
Public high schools in California
1962 establishments in California